"Look at Me" (stylized as "Look at Me!") is the debut single by American rapper XXXTentacion. The song premiered on December 30, 2015, on the SoundCloud account of Rojas, the song's co-producer, before initially being released for digital download as a single on January 29, 2016, becoming a sleeper hit in January 2017, in which the single was later re-released for digital download again with a remastered and clean version of the single on February 20, 2017, by Empire Distribution. The song serves as the lead single from his debut commercial mixtape Revenge. The track was produced by Rojas and Jimmy Duval, and heavily samples the 2007 song "Changes" by British dubstep DJ and record producer Mala.

The song peaked at number 34 on the US Billboard Hot 100. It currently has 205 million plays since its addition on SoundCloud, as well as over 470 million views on YouTube and had reached already 1.8B views on Spotify by 2022. "Look at Me" was certified Platinum by the Recording Industry Association of America (RIAA) on August 14, 2017, with over one million single-equivalent units.

The song is ranked as one of the 100 songs that defined the 2010s decade by Billboard.

Background
In verified annotations added along with song's lyrics on Genius, Rojas, the song's co-producer, spoke about how the song came together:

One day me and X were sitting at the crib going through beats and he wasn't really rocking with any of them, and then the last one I showed him was that beat, and he was like, "Rojas, this is it!"

In 15 minutes, it was done. X already knew the whole song in his head before he made it. He's creative as fuck. X decided to distort the whole track in one.

Rojas also spoke about the origin of the beat:

We made it at Jimmy Duval's Studio. The beat was actually made for Retch, when he came down to Miami after he had a show in Tampa.

He was staying at Jimmy’s crib after I introduced them, when me and Jimmy decided to work on some stuff for Retch. That’s when we made the "Look At Me!" beat. We never got to send it to Retch because he went to jail and I lost contact with him and his management.

Rojas lastly talked about how they found the sample:

A couple months before I sampled it, I was listening to a song by Young Roddy called "Water" and I was fucking with him heavy. I thought the sample was really hard and I wanted to use it but I failed with it so many times before I got it right.

The song was originally listed as a feature of Rojas, who is also a DJ, before later being renamed as a whole following the initial iTunes release.

Composition 
The track, which has a tempo of 139 BPM (beats per minute), heavily samples "Changes" by British dubstep DJ and record producer Mala. "Look at Me" features an extremely heavy and distorted bass, creating an aggressive feeling throughout the track. While some criticized the heavy distortion to be a case of bad mixing, Rojas, the producer, said the poor mixing and distortion on the track was intentional to differentiate the song from other popular hip hop songs at the time.

Chart performance
"Look at Me" debuted at number 94 on US Billboard Hot 100 for the chart dated February 25, 2017, and peaked at number 34. The track charted for 20 weeks, becoming his longest charting song until the release of "SAD!" (later becoming his longest-charting track with 38 weeks on the chart). It is XXXTENTACION's first charting single, later making it into the Billboard Year-End Hot 100 singles of 2017 at number 99. "Look at Me" was certified 2× Platinum by the Recording Industry Association of America (RIAA) on July 31, 2019, with over two million units sold.

Music video
The official music video for "Look at Me" was released on the artist's YouTube channel on September 12, 2017. The video features both "Look at Me" and "Riot" by XXXTENTACION.

Controversy
The song first received notable attention and controversy in early 2017 when Canadian rapper Drake used a similar rap flow from "Look at Me" in an unreleased song. It sparked a viral surge in the song's popularity, as well as Onfroy himself, while he was incarcerated at the time. Drake released the song "KMT" featuring English rapper Giggs on his commercial mixtape More Life, which was marketed as a "playlist."

The song received further controversy in September 2017 when the music video was released depicting a white child being hanged on stage in addition to other various depictions of murder and death. Although heavily criticized by conservative news outlets, Onfroy clarified via Instagram that the video was meant to be taken seriously as a form of art, and that it was a form of shock value. Soon after, Onfroy claimed on an Instagram video that a member of the Ku Klux Klan had threatened him for the depictions in the song.

Charts

Weekly charts

Year-end charts

Certifications

References

External links
Lyrics of this song at Genius

2016 debut singles
2017 singles
2015 songs
Music video controversies
Songs written by XXXTentacion
XXXTentacion songs
Empire Distribution singles
Race-related controversies in music